Bruno Martini (born 1970) is a French team handball goalkeeper. He competed at the 1996 Summer Olympics, where the French team placed 4th, and also at the 2000 Summer Olympics, where the team placed 6th.

References

External links

1970 births
Living people
French male handball players
Olympic handball players of France
Handball players at the 1996 Summer Olympics
Handball players at the 2000 Summer Olympics